Mahurea is a plant genus in the family Calophyllaceae. The genus comprises 2 species, occurring in Colombia, Venezuela, Guyana, French Guiana, Peru, and northern Brazil.

The species are shrubs or medium-sized evergreen trees with reddish wood. They bear terminal panicles of pinkish or purplish flowers.

References

Calophyllaceae
Malpighiales genera